Coptosia albovittigera is a species of beetle in the family Cerambycidae. It was described by Heyden in 1863, originally under the genus Phytoecia. It is known from North Macedonia, Greece, Bulgaria, and Turkey. It contains the varietas Coptosia albovittigera var. conjuncta.

References

Saperdini
Beetles described in 1863